William Keenan (1889 – 15 December 1955) was a British trade unionist and politician.

Born in Bootle, Keenan became an official of the Transport and General Workers' Union in 1923.  He also joined the Labour Party, and was elected to Bootle Town Council in 1925, serving until 1945, including a term as Mayor of Bootle in 1944. He was Labour Member of Parliament (MP) for  Liverpool Kirkdale from 1945 to 1955.

References

External links 
 

1889 births
1955 deaths
UK MPs 1945–1950
UK MPs 1950–1951
UK MPs 1951–1955
Labour Party (UK) MPs for English constituencies
Transport and General Workers' Union-sponsored MPs
British republicans